Otothyrinae is a subfamily of South American catfishes of the family Loricariidae. Alternatively it is treated as a tribe in Hypoptopomatinae.

References

Loricariidae
Ray-finned fish subfamilies